Oxycera rara, the four-barred major, is a European species of soldier fly.

Description
Adult body length 7 mm. Wing length 6 mm. In both male and female, the scutellum has two spines. The most diagnostic character for this species is that tergite 2 is entirely black with no markings.

Distribution
In the European continent: southern England, Wales, Italy, Andorra, Austria, Belgium, Czech Republic, France, Germany, Hungary, Netherlands, Poland, Romania, Slovakia, Slovenia, Spain, Switzerland, Yugoslavia.
In the African continent: Tunisia and Algeria.

References

Stratiomyidae
Diptera of Europe
Insects described in 1763
Taxa named by Giovanni Antonio Scopoli